Siege of Kaifeng may refer to:

 Jingkang Incident in 1127, a conflict in the Jin–Song wars between the Southern Song and the Jin dynasty
 Mongol siege of Kaifeng in 1232, a major battle in the Mongol-Jin War